Gymnasium Kiril Pejčinoviḱ" (in Macedonian: СОУ Гимназија „Кирил Пејчиновиќ“, Albanian: Gjimnazi „Kiril Pejçinoviq“) is a gymnasium
in  Tetovo, North Macedonia. It was established in 1947 and named after the enlightener Kiril Pejčinoviḱ.

External links 
 Gimnazija "Kiril Pejcinovic" website 

1947 establishments in Yugoslavia
Education in North Macedonia
Educational institutions established in 1947